The Prinsengrachtconcert is an annual open-air concert of classical music held annually in August since 1981 on the Prinsengracht in Amsterdam. The orchestra is situated on a pontoon anchored in front of the Hotel Pulitzer; much of the audience watches and listens from boats. Traditionally the concert is closed with a rendition of one of the city's anthems, "Aan de Amsterdamse grachten".

Since 1984 it is televised by the AVRO. Since 1998 it is part of the Grachtenfestival, though still independently organized; the first Prinsengrachtconcert on ice was held in February 2012.

References

Concerts
Music in Amsterdam